Johan Ström (born 22 June 1971) is a retired Swedish football defender.

References

1971 births
Living people
Swedish footballers
Degerfors IF players
Association football defenders
Allsvenskan players